The Rodrigues day gecko (Phelsuma edwardnewtoni), also known commonly as the Rodrigues blue-dotted day gecko, is an extinct species of day gecko, a lizard in the family Gekkonidae. The species was endemic to the island of Rodrigues, where it typically inhabited forests and dwelt in trees. The Rodrigues day gecko fed on insects and nectar.

Etymology
The specific name, edwardnewtoni, is in honor of British colonial administrator and ornithologist Edward Newton.

Taxonomy
 
The Rodrigues day gecko is now extinct. It was originally described as Phelsuma newtoni by Boulenger in 1884, also spelt Phelsuma newtonii by Boulenger in 1885. However, because this scientific name was also used as a synonym for Phelsuma gigas, Vinson & Vinson changed the specific name to edwardnewtoni in 1969.

Description
P. edwardnewtoni was one of the largest day geckos. Earlier investigators describe the animal as being quite common. However, this species has not been sighted since 1917, in spite of thorough searches in the 1960s and 1970s on Rodrigues and all offshore islets. Today, only six preserved specimens remain, which are in The Natural History Museum in London and the Paris Natural History Museum. These specimens have been preserved in alcohol and show a thick-bodied, robust Phelsuma. The body colour in life has been described as bright green with bright blue spots on the back. The underside of the tail was whitish-yellow. The chin had a deep yellow colour.

Behaviour and ecology
The species P. edwardnewtoni inhabited Rodrigues Island and its surrounding islets. P. edwardnewtoni was observed on coconut trees and other palms. Its habitat has been largely destroyed by humans and introduced animals such as cats and rats, which may have been the main cause of its extinction.

This day gecko fed mainly on palm fruit, and various insects and other invertebrates associated with palm trees. It also liked to lick soft, sweet fruit, pollen and nectar.

P. edwardnewtoni was documented as being unafraid of humans. It was quite tame and would even eat fruit from one's hand. Leguat described the behaviour as follows:

It can also be noted that the behavior of this species was most likely very similar to other island dwelling day geckos such as the Madagascar giant day gecko (Phelsuma grandis) and Standing's day gecko (P. standingi) which share a very similar niche as this species.

References

Further reading
Boulenger GA (1884). "Note upon a large Lizard of the Genus Phelsuma, from Rodriguez, sent by Mr. J.C. O'Halloran". Proceedings of the Zoological Society of London 1884: 1-2. ("Phelsuma newtoni [sic]", new species).
Boulenger GA (1885). Catalogue of the Lizards in the British Museum (Natural History). Second Edition. Volume I. Geckonidæ ... London: Trustees of the British Museum (Natural History). (Taylor and Francis, printers). xii + 436 pp. + Plates I-XXXII. ("Phelsuma newtonii [sic]", pp. 212–213 + Plate XVII).
Henkel F-W, Schmidt W (1995). Amphibien und Reptilien Madagaskars, der Maskarenen, Seychellen und Komoren. Stuttgart: Ulmer. .
McKeown, Sean (1993). The general care and maintenance of day geckos. Lakeside, California: Advanced Vivarium Systems.
Vinson J, Vinson J-M (1969). "The saurian fauna of the Mascarene Islands". Mauritius Institute Bulletin 6: 203–320. (Phelsuma edwardnewtoni, replacement name).

Phelsuma
Fauna of Rodrigues
Reptile extinctions since 1500
Reptiles described in 1969